Pitta is the surname of the following people:
Celso Pitta (1946–2009), Brazilian politician
Dennis Pitta (born 1985), American professional football player
Eduardo Pitta (born 1949), Portuguese poet, fiction writer and essayist
Grand Admiral Danetta Pitta, a Grand Admiral in the Star Wars expanded universe